"Walk" is a song by American heavy metal band Pantera from their sixth album Vulgar Display of Power. A live performance of "Walk" is included on Official Live: 101 Proof, and the studio version is also on the band's greatest hits album, The Best of Pantera: Far Beyond the Great Southern Cowboys' Vulgar Hits!.

Song information
The riff for "Walk" is played in a time signature of 12/8. Dimebag Darrell played the riff at a soundcheck during the tour for Cowboys from Hell and the rest of the band loved it.

Vocalist Phil Anselmo said that the message of the song was "Take your fucking attitude and take a fuckin' walk with that. Keep that shit away from me". His message was aimed at friends that treated the band differently when they arrived home after touring for Cowboys from Hell.  He said "they thought it had gone to our heads, like we've got this rock-star thing embroidered across our faces".

The music video was shot at the Riviera Theatre in Chicago. The cover for the single is a screenshot of the band's "Mouth for War" music video.

In 2019, the song was prominently featured in the film Triple Frontier.

"Walk" was included on the soundtrack for the 2022 film, Sonic the Hedgehog 2, and was played during a scene where Dr. Robotnik was attacking Sonic in the Death Egg Robot.

Release
The song was released as the fourth and final single from Pantera's Vulgar Display of Power album in 1993. The band also released a number of EPs and remixes for the song in 1993, including:

 Walk
 Walk Biomechanical
 Walk Live Material
 Walk Cervical

Reception and accolades
The song is considered to be one of the band's best tracks and is also one of the band's most well known songs to both Pantera fans and casual listeners. The song is the most viewed Pantera song on YouTube, with over 215 million views as of 2022. The song ranked number 16 on VH1's 40 Greatest Metal Songs. Guitar World magazine voted the song's solo the 57th greatest of all time. The song peaked at number 35 on the UK Singles Chart, becoming the band's first UK top 40 hit.

Personnel 

 Phil Anselmo – vocals
 Dimebag Darrell – guitar
 Rex Brown – bass
 Vinnie Paul – drums

Notable covers

 Sully Erna, singer of Godsmack, performed the song with Pantera members which is found on their DVD Smack This!.
 Avenged Sevenfold's cover of the song was released as a single to promote their live album Live in the LBC & Diamonds in the Rough. It was released as the first single on the album. However, the song was originally recorded for the band's first DVD, All Excess.
 American heavy metal band Kilgore covered the song for American wrestling promotion Extreme Championship Wrestling, since one of their most popular wrestlers, Rob Van Dam used both Pantera's and Kilgore's versions of "Walk".
 Front Line Assembly sampled the main riff in their 1994 single "Surface Patterns".

Charts

References

1992 songs
1993 singles
Pantera songs
East West Records singles
Song recordings produced by Terry Date
Songs written by Dimebag Darrell
Songs written by Vinnie Paul
Songs written by Phil Anselmo
Songs written by Rex Brown